Kevin Welsh is a former a U.S. soccer forward who played five seasons in the North American Soccer League, one in the American Soccer League and at least one in the Major Indoor Soccer League.  He also earned one cap with the U.S. national team.

College
Welsh attended University of Bridgeport where he played on the men's soccer team from 1971 to 1974.  During his four seasons he was a four-time Northeast All-Star Game selection and three time All-Northeast Team.  He graduated cum laude in 1975.

Professional
In 1975, the expansion Hartford Bicentennials of the North American Soccer League selected Welsh in the first round of the NASL draft. He spent the 1975 and 1976 seasons with Hartford.  He then moved to Scotland where he played for Ayr United.  He returned to the United States for the 1977 season and played for the New Jersey Americans of the American Soccer League.  He returned to the NASL in 1978 as the first player to sign with the expansion New England Tea Men.  Following the 1980-1981 indoor season, the Tea Men moved to Florida, but Welsh did not make the move.  He finished his career with the Philadelphia Fever in the Major Indoor Soccer League.

National team
Welsh earned his one cap with the United States men's national soccer team in a 4-0 loss to Poland on June 24, 1975.  He came on for Doug Wark in the 84th minute.

Welsh later served as the Executive Assistant to the President and CEO of the New Jersey Sports and Exposition Authority.  He then served as a Vice President with Hampshire Management Co., in New Jersey.  He is currently with the CB Richard Ellis.

References

External links
 NASL/MISL stats

1953 births
American Soccer League (1933–1983) players
American soccer players
American expatriate soccer players
Soccer players from Trenton, New Jersey
Connecticut Bicentennials players
Major Indoor Soccer League (1978–1992) players
North American Soccer League (1968–1984) indoor players
New England Tea Men players
New Jersey Americans (ASL) players
North American Soccer League (1968–1984) players
Philadelphia Fever (MISL) players
United States men's international soccer players
Living people
Ayr United F.C. players
Association football forwards